Makedonia TV (Greek: Μακεδονία TV) is a Greek private national free-to-air television channel broadcasting from Marousi, Athens and earlier from Thessaloniki, the capital of Macedonia in Greece. It was founded in 1991 by a group of journalists from the newspaper of the same name.

Programming
The foreign program includes a big variety of series: comedy, drama, and action as well as big heat series and feature films from the big production studios that broadcast daily; Sex and the City, Amores Verdaderos, Just for Laughs, Rookie Blue, Bold And Beautiful, La Tempestad, Mayday, In Treatment, Spartacus and many more.

From 3 September 2018, the network changed its programming which includes only foreign series and telenovelas.

Current
Chicago Fire
Deutschland 83
Satisfaction
Saving Hope
Scandal
Shades of Blue
Sons of Anarchy
Suits
The Blacklist
The Mafia Kills Only in Summer
Top Gear

Former
Shows
Kalimera
m.esa ekso
Thes de thes Thessaloniki
Cine Club
Banana Mix
Kane Paixnidi
LIP GLOSS
m.aziptero
TAKSIDIOTES
Sound Box
Koritsia gia Spiti
Ena klik pio konta...
Ola Kala (Gossip show)
Derby (Sports show)
My Moment
H Poli Mou
Gefseis Kai Oinos
Ygeia
Tenekes

Foreign series
Amores verdaderos
Bewitched
Color Rhapsody
Dinosaucers
Family Guy
Futurama
Happily Divorced
Harsh Realm
Jumanji
Just for Laughs
Lady, la vendedora de rosas
La Doña
Las Estrellas
La Patrona
La Tempestad
Malcolm in the Middle
Reina de corazones
Rookie Blue
Santa Diabla
Sex and the City
Sky Dancers
Space Goofs
Spartacus
The Bold and the Beautiful
The Real Ghostbusters
The Simpsons
The Young Pope
Triunfo del amor
Two Guys and a Girl

Logos

References

External links
Official Site 

Television channels in Greece
Television networks in Greece
Greek-language television stations
Macedonia (Greece)
Television channels and stations established in 1991
Mass media in Thessaloniki
1991 establishments in Greece